ETA SA is the largest consortium of Swiss watchmakers. It is a subsidiary of The Swatch Group. It sells millions of movements every year.

Current mechanical movements

Discontinued mechanical movements
 1120 (manual wind, sub-second, 15/17 jewels, 18000vph, reserve 42h)
 2660 (manual wind, sweep-second, 17 jewels, 28800vph, reserve 45h)
 7001 (manual wind, sub-second, 17 jewels, 21600vph, reserve 42h)
 2850 (manual wind, sweep-second, 17 jewels, 28800vph, reserve 50h)
 2512 (manual wind, 17/19 jewels, 21600vph, reserve 30h)
 2452 (automatic wind, date, sweep-second, jewels, 18000vph, reserve 42h)
 2750 (manual wind, sweep-second, 17 jewels, 21600vph, reserve 48h)
 2890 (automatic, sweep-second, 21 jewels, 28800vph, reserve 42h)
 2770 (automatic, sweep-second, 17/21/25 jewels, 21600vph, reserve 46h)
 2450 (automatic, sweep-second, 17/21/25/30 jewels, 18000vph, reserve 42h)
 2540 (manual wind, sweep-second, 17 jewels, 21600vph, reserve 44h)
 2550 (automatic, sweep-second, 17/21/23 jewels, 21600vph, reserve 42h)
 1080 (manual wind, sweep-second, 17/19/21 jewels, 18000vph, reserve 42h)

See also
 ETA SA

References

 

Watch movement manufacturers
The Swatch Group
Watch manufacturing companies of Switzerland